Citroën Xsara Kit Car is a rally car derived from the Citroën Xsara, it was built by Citroën Sport based on the FIA ​​Kit car F2 regulations to participate in the French Rally Championship, in which it raced from 1998 to 2001.

Background 
In March 1997, development works on the engine began, and in April - on the body structure. The first car was delivered for further optimization on July 12, 1997. The final version made its debut at the Lyon-Charbonnieres Rally in March 1998.

Championship of France and Spain 
Already during the first start in the Lyon-Charbonnieres Rally, Philippe Bugalski, driving an Xsara, won the general classification of the rally. Bugalski won 6 out of the 10 rallies of the 1998 French championship with the Xsara and eventually won the championship. The following season was even better, driving the Xsara Kit Car, the French won 9 out of 10 rallies and again won the overall standings.

The same was true in Spain, where Jesús Puras won the national championship three times in 1998–2000 driving the Xsara Kit Car. In 2001 the Xsara Kit Car triumphed again on the rally routes of France, Sébastien Loeb at the wheel won the French championship, winning 6 out of 10 rallies.

European Championship 
The first victory of the Xsara Kit Car in the rallies included in the European Championship was achieved by Philippe Bugalski during the Rally d'Antibes in 1998, this season he won in the last rally of the season - Rally du Var. Ultimately, it allowed for the third place in the general classification of the championship.

Another victory came at the beginning of the 1999 season in the Rally El Corte Inglés, where Jesús Puras competed in Xsara. In turn, in the d'Antibes and du Var rallies this season, Philippe Bugalski won for the second time in a row.

Bruno Thiry was the most successful driver of the Xsara Kit Car in the 2000 season. In the El Corte Inglés Rally, Xsary took the first two places, Jesús Puras won, and Thiry was second. He also won the Albena Rally and was in third place in three other rallies. Ultimately, this allowed them to win the European runner-up in the 2000 season. Xsara also triumphed this season thanks to Sébastien Loeb, who won the Rally du Var, and also in the 2001 season, where Loeb won the Rally d'Antibes.

World Cup 
Due to the characteristics of the car, competitions in the World Rally Championship were limited only to rallies taking place on asphalt surfaces, where the front-wheel Xsara Kit Car was competitive with the four-drive WRC cars.

Xsara's debut in the World Rally Championship was at Rally Catalonia in April 1998. Unfortunately, Jesús Puras did not finish the rally due to an engine failure. However, Philippe Bugalski took a good fifth place. The following rallies in the season were not happy for Citroën drivers who did not record good results.

In 1999, the Xsara Kit Car was the most successful. It started with a sensational victory for Philippe Bugalski in the Catalan Rally, which dethroned rivals such as Richard Burns in a Subaru Impreza WRC, Didier Auriol in a Toyota Corolla WRC, and Tommi Mäkinen in a Mitsubishi Lancer Evo VI.

The biggest success of the Kit Car model was taking the first two places during the Corsica Rally. Once again, Philippe Bugalski was first, followed by Jesús Puras, ahead of Carlos Sainz in the Toyota Corolla WRC and Colin McRae in the Ford Focus WRC.

Unfortunately, the above victories turned out to be the beginning of the end of the Xsara Kit Car's splendor. For the 2000 season, the FIA ​​Council planned changes in the F2 class, in which the Xsars competed, by increasing the minimum weight of the cars. Thus, they were deprived of their greatest advantage - low weight.

WRC victories

WRC results

References

External links

 Results at ewrc-results.com
 Kun Xsaralla voitettiin nelivetoiset WRC-autot

World Rally Cars
Xsara Kit Car
All-wheel-drive vehicles
World Rally championship-winning cars